Nurgül Yeşilçay (born 26 March 1976) is a Turkish actress.

Biography
Nurgül Yeşilçay was born in Afyonkarahisar, Turkey, in 1976. She studied drama at the State Conservatoire of Anadolu University in Eskişehir. Since her graduation, she has performed several major roles for the stage, including Ophelia in Hamlet and Blanche DuBois in A Streetcar Named Desire. Theatre aside, she shot to prominence as the lead in, among others, three record-breaking Turkish television dramas. Her film Edge of Heaven won the prize for best screenplay at the 60th Cannes Film Festival in 2007. She reported "big projects were offered to me by well-known producers in Cannes. But my son is a baby. I need begin new life. I can't." She made her screen debut in 2001 in Semir Arslanyürek's feature Şellale (The Waterfall). She won the "Best Actress" award at the 45th Antalya Golden Orange Film Festival with the film Vicdan.

Filmography

Theater 
 Aşk Gibi, 2002
 Sen Olmasaydın, 2006 (together with Cem Özer)
 Geleceğin Starı, 2018 (judge) Star TV

Awards
Golden Boll Award for Best Actress (Borrowed Bride) 2005
Sadri Alışık Acting Awards for Best Actress (Adam and the Devil) 2008
Contemporary Screen Actors Guild Awards (ÇASOD) for Best Actress (Adam and the Devıl-The Edge of Heaven) 2008
Golden Orange Award for Best Actress (Conscience) 2008
20th Sadri Alışık Acting Awards for Best Actress (Gece) 2014.
Distinctive International Arab Festivals Awards for Best Actress (Muhteşem Yüzyıl: Kösem) 2017

References

External links 
 
 Biography of Nurgül Yeşilçay 
 Biography of Nurgül Yeşilçay 

1976 births
Living people
Turkish stage actresses
Turkish film actresses
Best Actress Golden Boll Award winners
Best Actress Golden Orange Award winners
Anadolu University alumni
People from Afyonkarahisar
20th-century Turkish actresses
21st-century Turkish actresses